Dylan Bosch (born 17 July 1993) is a South African swimmer. He competed in the men's 4 × 200 metre freestyle relay event at the 2016 Summer Olympics. The team finished in 11th place in the heats and did not advance.

References

External links
 
 
 
 
 
 

1993 births
Living people
South African male swimmers
Olympic swimmers of South Africa
Swimmers at the 2016 Summer Olympics
Place of birth missing (living people)
Swimmers at the 2010 Summer Youth Olympics
Commonwealth Games medallists in swimming
Commonwealth Games bronze medallists for South Africa
Swimmers at the 2014 Commonwealth Games
South African male freestyle swimmers
Michigan Wolverines men's swimmers
21st-century South African people
20th-century South African people
Medallists at the 2014 Commonwealth Games